Otomops is a genus of bat in the family Molossidae. Molecular sequence data supports it as a monophyletic taxon, although not a number of other molossid genera.

Otomops contains the following species:
 O. formosus, Javan mastiff bat
 O. harrisoni, Harrison's large-eared giant mastiff bat
 O. johnstonei, Johnstone's mastiff bat
 O. madagascariensis, Madagascar free-tailed bat
 O. martiensseni, large-eared free-tailed bat
 O. papuensis, big-eared mastiff bat
 O. secundus, mantled mastiff bat
 O. wroughtoni, Wroughton's free-tailed bat

References

 
Bat genera
Taxa named by Oldfield Thomas
Taxonomy articles created by Polbot